Sindhri is the biggest area and a town located in the Mirpur Khas District of the Sindh province of Pakistan. Previously, it was part of Tharparkar District in Sindh. Muhammad Khan Junejo, former prime minister of Pakistan, was born in this town.

Sindhri is also a type of mango grown in Sindh.

See also
 Chaunsa
 Sindhri Airport
 Sant Nenuram Ashram
 Hingorno

References

Populated places in Sindh
Tharparkar District
Mirpur Khas District